The Ionosonde Juliusruh is a facility of the institute for atmospheric physics near Juliusruh in northeastern Germany for sounding the ionosphere with radar systems in the short wave range (frequencies between 1 MHz and 30 MHz). The landmark of the station is a 70 metre high grounded free standing steel framework tower, which was built in 1960/61 and which carries a cage aerial for the transmitter of the ionosonde.

See also
List of towers

External links
 http://www.ionosonde.iap-kborn.de/indexeng.htm
 
 http://www.skyscraperpage.com/diagrams/?b45849

Research institutes in Germany
Towers